Dalbeattie (meaning 'haugh of the birch' or Dail bhàite 'drowned (i.e. liable to flood) haugh') is a town in the historical county of Kirkcudbrightshire in Dumfries and Galloway, Scotland. The town is famed for its granite industry and for being the home town of William McMaster Murdoch, the First Officer of the RMS Titanic.

Etymology 
Dalbeattie is a Gaelic name, recorded in 1469 as Dalbaty. The first element of the name is Gaelic dail 'water-meadow, haugh'. There are two possible interpretations for the second element. The most common is Gaelic beithich, genitive singular of beitheach 'abounding in or relating to birch trees', derived from beith 'birch'. Dalbeattie would thus mean 'haugh of the birch'. The second interpretation takes -beattie to be bhàite (from bàite) 'drowned', meaning 'liable to flooding'. W. J. Watson offers this derivation for Dalbate in Middleby.

Dalbeattie is popularly interpreted as 'birch valley' or 'birch vale', which is adopted in the names of local businesses such as Birch Valley Dental Clinic and Birchvale Theatre. The interpretation of the first element as 'vale' or 'valley' may be due to confusion with the word dale. The association with 'valley' goes back to at least 1955, when the Third Statistical Account records that the 'accepted derivation' is Celtic, meaning 'the valley of the birches'.

History

The formal beginnings of Dalbeattie originate in 1781 when George Maxwell of Munches and Alexander Copeland of Kingsgrange (or Colliston) decided to encourage the development of the town by feuing their property. The Maxwells owned the land on the north side of the burn and the Copelands owned the land on the south side. They also established a soup kitchen for local workers.

The building of the bridge over the River Urr at Craignair in 1797 and the rapid expansion of the granite industry in Dalbeattie attracted more people to settle in the town.

Governance
The town is under the management of Dumfries and Galloway council and is located in the Abbey ward. The town is in the Westminster constituency of Dumfries and Galloway and currently represent by Alister Jack. In the Scottish Parliament the town is within the Galloway and Upper Nithsdale constituency and the South of Scotland region and was represented by Alex Fergusson.

Geography
Dalbeattie is situated in the Urr valley of which most of the east side is covered by forest. The River Urr flows from the north southwards to the Solway Firth and passes by the west side of the town. The town has an abundance of distinctive grey granite.

Economy

Granite Quarrying

Formerly granite quarrying was an important part of the Dalbeattie economy. The most prominent of which is the characteristic Craignair quarry which is clearly visible to the west of the town. Dalbeattie Granite works was established in 1820 and was situated in Craignair Street, following a direct route from Craignair quarry.

Many of the workers emigrated to other parts of the world in order to find work, a number emigrated to the United States to work at a sister quarry in Westerly, Rhode Island. Granite exported from Dalbeattie went into the Mersey Docks in Liverpool, the Thames Embankment in London, various British lighthouses, even as far as the lighthouse at the southern tip of Ceylon (Sri Lanka).

Landmarks 

 The war memorial in Colliston Park was unveiled in September 1921, attended by Mr William Duncan. It commemorates those that died in World War I and, with additions, those that died in World War II. The memorial is a simplified version of the Mercat Cross in Edinburgh made of Dalbeattie granite, topped with the lion rampant of Galloway by Pilkington Jackson. The designers were W S Macgeorge and E.A. Hornel.
 The fountain on the junction of Mill Street and High Street was built in 1887 by D.H. & J. Newall to celebrate the Golden Jubilee of Queen Victoria.
 The single arch Buittle Bridge, or Craignair Bridge, that crosses the Urr Water is a Category A Listed building. It was completed in 1797 and replaced an earlier 2-arch bridge upstream which was destroyed by flooding shortly after it was built. The bridge is notable for having an unusually wide span for a single arch construction.
 Dalbeattie Town Hall was completed in 1862.

Transport
The town is accessible by roads from Dumfries, Castle Douglas, and is on the Solway coastal road. A regular bus service based in Dumfries travels through Dalbeattie and Castle Douglas to the west of the region and back. The town also acts as a minor hub for bus routes across the Solway coast. The town previously had access to the rail network; however, Dalbeattie railway station was removed in the 1960s as the line was deemed unprofitable.

Museums and Galleries 
Dalbeattie has a museum devoted to the history of the town and surrounding area. There is also a small art gallery, the Nail Factory which hosts temporary exhibitions, usually of work by local artists.

Notable people 
Bishop Andrew Carruthers, (1770-1852) was a priest and horticulturist. 
Murray Grierson is a retired rally driver who won the Scottish Rally Championship. 
Alister Jack (born 7 July 1963) is a Scottish politician serving as Secretary of State for Scotland since 2019. 
John Keats and his friend Charles Armitage Brown stayed at an inn here  on their walking tour of Scotland in 1818.
John Maxwell (1905-1962) artist born in the town.
Jimmy McKinnell was a professional footballer who played for Dumfries club Queen of the South F.C. and Blackburn Rovers.
William McMaster Murdoch was born and raised in Dalbeattie.
Ian Simpson a retired motorcycle racer who won the 1994 British Superbike Championship as well as 3 Isle of Man TT and 5 North West 200 races.
Jim Steel had a successful career as a footballer playing in England's lower divisions with Oldham Athletic, Wigan Athletic, Wrexham A.F.C., Port Vale and Tranmere Rovers.
Archbishop John Menzies Strain (1770-1852) in the town for twenty-three years before becoming the first Archbishop of St. Andrews and Edinburgh in 1878.
Andrew Swann (1878- unknown) professional footballer
 Fr George Thompson (1928-2016) parish priest, 1993-2005 of St Peter's,  teacher and former MP for Galloway.

References

External links 
Information about Dalbeattie
A website about the town
Community website
Dumfries and Galloway Council website
Early Life

 
Towns in Dumfries and Galloway
Kirkcudbrightshire